Eumestleta is a genus of moths of the family Erebidae. The genus was erected by Arthur Gardiner Butler in 1892.

It is considered by several sources to be a synonym of Eublemma Hübner, 1829.

Former species
 Eumestleta cinnamomea Herrich-Schäffer, 1868
 Eumestleta irresoluta Dyar, 1919
 Eumestleta recta Guenée, 1852

References

Eustrotiinae